Live at the Apollo is a live DVD recording by The Stranglers of their concert at The Hammersmith Apollo, London, on 19 March 2010. The sell-out return to Hammersmith featured a set-list drawing from across their 23-year recording career, from 'Down in The Sewer' off 1977's debut Album Rattus Norvegicus to New Release 'Retro Rockets'.   The concert was part of 'The Decades Apart Tour 2010', to promote the double CD compilation album Decades Apart that was released at the same time and included tracks from all 16 of the band's studio albums to date.  Initial released as a Double Disc package, which included a Live CD from the same concert, subsequent issue was the DVD only.

Track listings

DVD 
 Time To Die
 Go Buddy Go
 Grip
 Curfew
 Norfolk Coast
 Skin Deep
 Always The Sun
 Strange Little Girl
 Golden Brown
 Walk on By
 Retro Rockets
 Genetix
 Nice 'N Sleazy
 Peaches
 Lost Control
 Spectre of Love
 Down In The Sewer
 Nuclear Device
 Duchess
 5 Minutes
 Something Better Change
 Hanging Around
 No More Heroes

CD 
 Time To Die
 Go Buddy Go
 Grip
 Curfew
 Walk on By
 Genetix
 Nice 'N Sleazy
 Peaches
 Lost Control
 Spectre of Love
 Down In The Sewer
 Nuclear Device
 Duchess
 5 Minutes
 Something Better Change
 Hanging Around
 No More Heroes

References

2010 video albums
2010 live albums
Live video albums
The Stranglers live albums
The Stranglers video albums
Albums recorded at the Hammersmith Apollo